Patrick Lawrence Chapman  (20 December 1940 – 22 July 2022) was an English food writer, broadcaster and author, best known for founding The Curry Club.

Early days
Chapman was born in London during the Blitz. His grandfather had achieved senior rank in the British Indian Army; his father served in the wartime Merchant Navy and his mother was a former midwifery training sister at Queen Charlotte's Hospital London, before running her own maternity nursing home in Ealing. His primary education was dysfunctional, with him going to four schools. As a chorister at a local church, he auditioned to join the Westminster Abbey Choir School but failed because he had been watching trams driving around Westminster on a very smoggy evening, which clogged up his voice. Had he passed, he would have sung at Queen Elizabeth II's coronation ceremony in June 1953.  
Instead, his secondary education was at Bedales School whose headmaster, Hector Jacks, said that he would never pass A-Level examinations, which turned out to be true. 
Bedales, the countryside and the farm were revelations for a 13-year-old London boy, born and bred in the concrete jungle of Ealing.  He disliked afternoon sports and opted to do 'Outdoor Work' (O.W) instead.  At the time the Bedales farm was fully operational with a herd of Friesian cows, poultry and sheep. It also had a piggery at the south west corner of the estate, with its own pigman and a number of pedigree Wessex Saddleback pigs (with black bodies and a white-collar and front hooves). Pat chose to work at the piggery and' or the dairy (he learned to hand-milk and machine milk the cows) for his O.W. The farm supplied the school with meat, milk and fruit and vegetables.
Since being taken to a pantomime at the London Palladium, aged 10 or so, he became intrigued by all things backstage. He followed this by taking  course at the Central School of Speech and Drama, now renamed as The Royal Central School of Speech and Drama. Laurence Olivier and Peggy Ashcroft were Central's most famous alumni, though they were students (in 1925), long before Pat's time there. Pat's most celebrated contemporaries included Julie Christie and James Bolam.

As a teenager, Pat first obtained work during school holidays as an electrical stage hand at the Lyric Theatre Hammersmith then as a  light board operator in West End theatre land, obtaining a highly coveted NATKE union card. (The National Association of Theatrical Television and Kine Employees, which represented employees who worked in theatres, cinemas and television.) NATKE is now known as Unison. 
On leaving drama school, he worked full-time in the theatre, including stage management at the Belgrade Theatre Coventry, where from time to time he was required to play bit parts, and he actually 'trod the boards' with the likes of Ian McKellen, David Warner and Edina Ronay. 

He followed this by joining the Royal Air Force where he trained as a fast jet pilot. He then worked for six years on sales and marketing at Lesney Products, during which time he went to night school at Enfield Tech (latterly part of Middlesex University) obtaining an HNC in Business Studies and a Diploma from the Chartered Institute of Marketing.  This led to his being accepted as a mature student at Fitzwilliam College, University of Cambridge reading economics. At the same time he started the stage lighting and sound company, Entec. In 1968 his company established itself by providing the lighting for Cambridge May Balls, as well as performing liquid light shows for BBC Television, including a six-month contract on Top of the Pops and a four-part Doctor Who story, The Claws of Axos in 1970/1. Chapman was a pioneer in touring lighting for rock acts and festivals, introducing techniques which are in use to this day. Chapman and his crews provided lighting and sound systems for an eclectic mix of rock, heavy metal, pop and glam rock groups, including The Carpenters, Bing Crosby, Black Sabbath, Ray Conniff, Dusty Springfield, Bob Dylan, Bob Marley and the Wailers, Mud, The New Seekers, Lou Reed, Status Quo, Rod Stewart, Sweet, Ike and Tina Turner and Wings. In 1979 Chapman's investor, the Marquee Club's Harold Pendleton, took over Chapman's Entec interests. He moved to Haslemere, Surrey, and spent the next four years consulting to a number of major entertainment multiples including  Mecca Leisure Group, Rank Ballrooms, Warner Bros. and Pontins, both in the UK and overseas, advising on the equipping and installation of lighting and sound systems.

Branches of Chapman's family had lived in India from 1715 to 1935, first working for the East India Company then the British Raj. Chapman inherited their deep-rooted interest in the country, her history, her food and curry in particular.  He visited the sub-Continent more than 40 times. 

After he left school, Pat's friends, knowing his passion for the subject, asked him to teach them the secrets of spices and their cooking. At that time little information had been published on the subject of curry, yet national interest in the subject was emerging. He decided to set up a club as the vehicle to exchange information. In 1981 Chapman's friend and writing mentor, columnist Carol Sarler, then editor of Honey Magazine and currently a contributor to the Times Group wrote a piece on curry featuring the (then) non-existent Curry Club with recipes by Chapman. Time it was started. Carol had in effect kicked started The Curry Club.  Honey was a monthly magazine for young women in the United Kingdom[1] which Fleetway Publications launched in April 1960.[2] Audrey Slaughter (later wife of Charles Wintour and stepmother of Anna Wintour) founded it, with Jean McKinley as editor. Honey is regarded as having established the teen magazine sector in the UK. At its height, Honey sold about 250,000 copies a month.

Staff on Honey included Eve Pollard and Catherine Bennett after which was founded on 1 January 1982. Many like-minded people have joined the Curry Club since it began and come from every continent including Asia. Membership is a cross-section of the British public.

Later Life
Chapman frequently demonstrated curry, held regular curry cookery courses and took small groups of curry enthusiasts to India to visit a region and sample its cuisine.

From 2008 Chapman was an active member of the Army Benevolent Fund committee, specifically to help with fund-raising for their annual Big Curry event.

For the 2010 National Curry Week celebrations he was commissioned by Cobra Beer to create recipes which add spice to top British Regional favourite dishes.

From 2012 he was a trustee of the Cobra Foundation, an independent charity supported my Molson Coors and Cobra Beer to distribute funds to young people in South Asia by providing health, education, community support.

On 17 November 2019 Chapman was awarded a Lifetime Achievement Award at the Asian Curry Awards from the Asian Catering Federation, of which he is the longstanding Chairman of Judges.  Too ill to attend in person, (he was suffering from a very bad cold) fellow judge George Shaw accepted the award on his behalf saying, "Everyone who works in the curry sector owes Pat a huge debt and never has a Lifetime Achievement Award so been richly deserved."

Lifetime Achievement
On 22 November 2020 it was planned that Sanjay Anand of Madhu's Caterers and Restaurants would present this Lifetime Achievement Award to Pat Chapman in conjunction with Yawar Khan owner Akash Tandoori Restaurant, Wallington, Surrey and founder The Asian Catering Federation and Awards.
Because of COVID-19 this presentation was postponed due to the pandemic and the award was delivered to Chapman's home in Surrey.

Writing
Chapman's first cookery book, The Indian Restaurant Cookbook, was published in 1984 and is still in print. To date Chapman has written some 36 books, with international sales exceeding 2 million copies. Most are on Curry, but some of his other books cover cuisines such as Thai, Chinese, Middle Eastern and International spicy cuisines. His Balti Cookbook was the first on the subject and became a Sunday Times Number 1 bestseller.

Chapman built up a database on Indian restaurants, which as of 2018 contained over 10,000 entries. In 1984, this led to the publication of the Good Curry Guide, a critique of the top 1,000 UK curry restaurants. It has been sponsored by Cobra Beer since 1992, and was cited by the Oxford English Dictionary for usage of the word balti

Television appearances
Chapman appeared on British television many times, including on the shows Who'll Do The Pudding?, This Morning, Food and Drink, Great Food Live and Good Food Live.  He also had a regular spot on the Good Morning with Anne and Nick show.

See also
The Curry Club
Curry Club Magazine
Good Curry Guide
Curry Awards
Curry
Balti
Tandoori

Books
 Classic Cooks (compendium volume), Orion, London  —   (1998)	
 Curries - Masterchef Series, Orion, London —  (1996)	
 Curry, Human & Rousseau, South Africa  —  (1993)
 Kerrie, in Afrikaans, Human & Rousseau, South Africa —  (1993)
 Curry Club 100 Favourite Tandoori Recipes, Piatkus, London —   &  (1995)	
 Curry Club 250 Favourite Curries, Piatkus, London —  &  (1991)
 Curry Club Book of Indian Cuisine, US edition, Prima New York —     (1994)
 Curry Club 250 Hot and Spicy Dishes, Piatkus, London —  (1993)
 Curry Club Balti Curry Cookbook, Piatkus, London —  &  (1993)
 Modern Balti Curries, above title republished by John Blake Publishers, London (2006)
 Curry Club Bangladeshi Restaurant Curries, Piatkus, London —  (1996)
 Curry Club Chinese Restaurant Cookbook, Piatkus, London  —  &  (1989)		
 Curry Club Favourite Restaurant Curries, Piatkus, London —   &  (1988)		
 Modern Indian Cooking, above title republished by John Blake Publishers —  (2004)
 Homestyle Indian Cooking, US edition, Crossing Press, Berkeley, CA —  (1998)
 Curry Club Indian Restaurant Cookbook, Piatkus, London —  &  (1984)	
 Curry Club Middle Eastern Cookbook, Piatkus, London —  &  (1989)	
 Homestyle Middle Eastern Cooking, Crossing Press, Berkeley, CA  —  (1997)
 Curry Club Quick After Work Curries, Piatkus, London —  &  (1995)
 Quick After Work Curries, US edition, Fisher, Tucson, AZ —  (1996)
 Curry Club Tandoori and Tikka Dishes, Piatkus, London —  (1993)		
 Curry Club Vegetarian Cookbook, Piatkus, London —  &  (1990)
 Meatless Indian Cooking from the Curry Club, Prima Publications  —   (1995)
 Curry Club Vindaloo and other Hot Curries, Piatkus, London —  (1993)	
 India: Food & Cooking, New Holland, London —  (2007)
 Little Curry Book, Piatkus, London —  (1985)	
 El Librito del Amante del Curry, Spanish version of above title, pub El Cuerno, Madrid —  (1987)  (1986)
 Masterchefs (Compendium volume), Orion, London —  (1997)	
 North Indian Curries Classic Cooks, Orion —  (1997)
 Pat Chapman’s Balti Bible, Hodder & St —  &    (1998)  		
 Pat Chapman’s Curry Bible, Hodder & St —   &    &   &   (1997)
 Petit Plats Curry, French edition, Hachette Marabout, Paris   —   (2000)		
 New Curry Bible, republished by John Blake Publishers	  (2005)
 Pat Chapman’s Noodle Book, Hodder & Stoughton, London  —  (1998)
 Pat Chapman’s Quick and Easy Curries, BBC Books —  (1995)
 Pat Chapman’s Taste of the Raj, Hodder & Stoughton, London —  (1997)
 Pat Chapman’s Thai Restaurant Cookbook, Hodder & Stoughton, London —  &  (1996)
 Pat Chapman’s Vegetable Curry Bible, Hodder & Stoughton, London —   (2000)
 Sainsbury’s Curries, Octopus, London —  (1989)
 Sainsbury’s Balti Cookbook, Martin Books, Cambridge —  (1994)
 Sainsbury’s Quick and Easy Stir-fries, Martin Books, Cambridge  —  (1997)
 1984 Good Curry Guide, Curry Club — 	
 1987 Good Curry Guide, Piatkus, London —  	
 1991 Cobra Good Curry Guide, Piatkus, London — 
 1995 Cobra Good Curry Guide, Piatkus, London — 
 1998 Cobra Good Curry Guide, Hodder & Stoughton, London — 
 1999 Cobra Good Curry Guide, Hodder & Stoughton, London — 
 2000 Cobra Curryholics' Directory, John Blake Publishing, London — 
 2001 Cobra Good Curry Guide, Simon & Schuster, London — 
 2004 Cobra Good Curry Guide, Curry Club, Haslemere  — 
 2007 Cobra Good Curry Guide, John Blake Publishing, London — 
 2009 Cobra Good Curry Guide, John Blake Publishing, London — 
 2010 Cobra Good Curry Guide, John Blake Publishing, London —  New cover same text as 2009.
 2013 Cobra Good Curry Guide, Curry Club Publisher, Haslemere —  Complete rewrite.

DVDs
 Pat Chapman's Curry Magic (2006)

References

Pat Chapman Belgrade Theatre 6.   https://theatricalia.com/person/1pq7/patrick-chapman

External links
An interview with Pat Chapman
The Independent
Theatricalia

Living people
1940 births
People from Ealing
People educated at Bedales School
Royal Air Force officers
Alumni of Fitzwilliam College, Cambridge
People from Haslemere
English chefs
English television chefs
English food writers
British cookbook writers